Kenarak may refer to:
Konarak, Iran, a city in Iran
Kenarak Island, an island of Iran